KAWC-FM (88.9 FM) is a radio station broadcasting a News-Talk and Information programming, along with a few classical music and jazz programs. Licensed to Yuma, Arizona, United States, it serves the Yuma area.  The station is currently owned by Arizona Western College and features programming from National Public Radio and Public Radio International.

Since November 2013, KAWC-FM's programming has been simulcast on 88.9 KAWP in Parker, Arizona

External links

AWC-FM
NPR member stations
Radio stations established in 1970
1970 establishments in Arizona